Robert Shadley may refer to:

 Robert D. Shadley (born 1942), United States Army general
 Robert H. Shadley (born 1926), American politician in the Florida House of Representatives